ECJ is a freeware evolutionary computation research system written in Java.  It is a framework that supports a variety of evolutionary computation techniques, such as genetic algorithms, genetic programming, evolution strategies, coevolution, particle swarm optimization, and differential evolution.  The framework models iterative evolutionary processes using a series of pipelines arranged to connect one or more subpopulations of individuals with selection, breeding (such as crossover, and mutation operators that produce new individuals.  The framework is open source and is distributed under the Academic Free License.  ECJ was created by Sean Luke, a computer science professor at George Mason University, and is maintained by Sean Luke and a variety of contributors.

Features (listed from ECJ's project page):

General Features:

 GUI with charting
 Platform-independent checkpointing and logging
 Hierarchical parameter files
 Multithreading
 Mersenne Twister Random Number Generators
 Abstractions for implementing a variety of EC forms.

EC Features:

 Asynchronous island models over TCP/IP
 Master/Slave evaluation over multiple processors
 Genetic Algorithms/Programming style Steady State and Generational evolution, with or without Elitism
 Evolutionary-Strategies style (mu, lambda) and (mu+lambda) evolution
 Very flexible breeding architecture
 Many selection operators
 Multiple subpopulations and species
 Inter-subpopulation exchanges
 Reading populations from files
 Single- and Multi-population coevolution
 SPEA2 multiobjective optimization
 Particle Swarm Optimization
 Differential Evolution
 Spatially embedded evolutionary algorithms
 Hooks for other multiobjective optimization methods
 Packages for parsimony pressure

GP Tree Representations:

 Set-based Strongly Typed Genetic Programming
 Ephemeral Random Constants
 Automatically Defined Functions and Automatically Defined Macros
 Multiple tree forests
 Six tree-creation algorithms
 Extensive set of GP breeding operators
 Seven pre-done GP application problem domains (ant, regression, multiplexer, lawnmower, parity, two-box, edge)

Vector (GA/ES) Representations:

 Fixed-Length and Variable-Length Genomes
 Arbitrary representations
 Five pre-done vector application problem domains (sum, rosenbrock, sphere, step, noisy-quartic)

Other Representations:

 NEAT
 Multiset-based genomes in the rule package, for evolving Pitt-approach rulesets or other set-based representations.

See also
 Paradiseo, a metaheuristics framework
 MOEA Framework, an open source Java framework for multiobjective evolutionary algorithms

References
 ECJ project page
 Wilson, G. C. McIntyre, A. Heywood, M. I. (2004), "Resource Review: Three Open Source Systems for Evolving Programs-Lilgp, ECJ and Grammatical Evolution", Genetic Programming And Evolvable Machines, 5 (19): 103-105, Kluwer Academic Publishers. ISSN 1389-2576

Evolutionary computation
Agent-based software
Free software programmed in Java (programming language)